Nishant (English: Night's End) is a 1975 Hindi drama film directed by Shyam Benegal, based on an original screenplay by noted playwright Vijay Tendulkar, with dialogues by Satyadev Dubey.

The film features an ensemble of parallel cinema actors including Girish Karnad, Amrish Puri, Shabana Azmi, Mohan Agashe, Anant Nag and Sadhu Meher with Smita Patil and Naseeruddin Shah. The film focuses on the power of the rural elite and the sexual exploitation of women, during the time of feudalism in Telangana (Hyderabad State in the 1940s and 1950s).

The film won the 1977 National Film Award for Best Feature Film in Hindi. It was selected to compete for the Palme d'Or at the 1976 Cannes Film Festival. It was invited to the London Film Festival of 1976, Melbourne International Film Festival of 1977, and the Chicago International Film Festival of 1977, where it was awarded the Golden Plaque.

Plot 
Vishwam is the youngest brother of the powerful and influential village jagirdar. The jagirdar will not hesitate to do anything for the welfare and protection of his family, which also includes bending the law to his own advantage.  The shy and quiet Vishwam is married to Rukmani and, but his brothers Anjaiya and Prasad, make it a practice to demand the services of any village women they fancy.

The village gets a new schoolmaster, who arrives in the village with a wife, Sushila, and a son. When Vishwam sees Sushila for the first time, he is unable to take his eyes off her, and unable to get her out of his mind. Sushila does not reciprocate his attentions. One night, while the schoolmaster is enjoying a quiet dinner with his family, someone knocks on the door and, when Shushila goes to answer the door, the two older brothers of Vishwam grab her and take her away forcibly. Several people are present, but no one dares to raise a hand or voice to stop this abduction. At the jagirdar's house Sushila is raped regularly and repeatedly at the will of the jagirdar and his brothers. The distraught schoolteacher, who is denied justice by everyone from the local police officer to the district collector, is helped by the old priest of the village temple. They succeed in mobilizing the villagers who slaughter their oppressors. In the end the frenzied villagers also kill the innocent Rukmani as well as Sushila whom her husband was trying to rescue.

Cast 
Girish Karnad as School master
Shabana Azmi as Sushila, School master's wife
 Amrish Puri as the Jagirdar.
 Anant Nag as Anjaiya, younger brother of Jagirdar
 Mohan Agashe as Prasad, younger brother of Jagirdar
 Naseeruddin Shah as Vishwam, youngest brother of Jagirdar
 Smita Patil as Rukmini, Vishwam's wife
 Satyadev Dubey as Village Priest (Pujari)
 Kulbhushan Kharbanda as Police Patel
 Sadhu Meher - Special appearance, who is accused of stealing temple jewellery 
 Savita Bajaj as Jagirdar's household servant Pochamma
 Master Altaf as Sushila's son

Production 

Smita Patil and Naseeruddin Shah made their debut in this film.

The shooting location is Pochampalli village in Telangana, known as 'weavers village' and is popular for its hand woven sarees.

Soundtrack 
The movie has only one song at the end "Piya Baj Pyala" sung by Preeti Sagar and the music is given by Vanraj Bhatia.

Reception

The film, is one of the landmark films of Indian art house cinema has received praise from all quarters. The daily newspaper The Hindu praised the movie greatly in its article dated 4 October 2012, in the following words: "Miles removed from the work of everyday filmmakers, for many of whom cinema is nothing more than a hero waiting in eager anticipation of the heroine and post-dinner desserts, Benegal's "Nishant" (Night's End) is a dawn that did not come an hour too soon. The National Award for the best film, the nomination for the Oscars were just rewards for a film that lived up to its name. "

Accolades 

|-
| 1975
| Freni M. Variava, Mohan J. Bijlani
| National Film Award for Best Feature Film in Hindi
| 
|-
| rowspan="4"|1976
| Freni M. Variava, Mohan J. Bijlani
|Bengal Film Journalists' Association – Best Indian Films Award
|
|-
| Shyam Benegal
| Best Director (Hindi section) - Bengal Film Journalists' Association Awards
| 
|-
| Vijay Tendulkar
| Best Screenplay (Hindi section) - Bengal Film Journalists' Association Awards
| 
|-
| Shyam Benegal
| Palme d'Or
| 
|}

References

External links
 
 Review at Filmi Geek

1975 films
1975 drama films
1970s Hindi-language films
Gang rape in fiction
Indian drama films
Films about social issues in India
Films about women in India
Films directed by Shyam Benegal
Films with screenplays by Vijay Tendulkar
Best Hindi Feature Film National Film Award winners
Hindi-language drama films